S. Larry Goldenberg,  (born 1953) is a Canadian researcher in the field of medicine and a pioneer in the treatment of prostate cancer.

Goldenberg was born in Toronto, Ontario to survivors of the Holocaust who had immigrated to Canada after the Second World War. He completed his medical training at the University of Toronto in 1978. He is married to Paula Gordon, a pioneer in the diagnostic imaging of breast cancer and recipient of the Order of Canada. They have two sons. Goldenberg is currently Professor and Head of the Department of Urologic Sciences at the University of British Columbia. He holds adjunct faculty appointments at the BC Cancer Agency and the University of Washington, and is a past president of the American Urological Association, Western Section of the Canadian Urological Association, and the Northwest Urological Association.

Honours 
1984, named a Terry Fox Fellow of the Cancer Research Centre
2006, named a Fellow of the Canadian Academy of Health Sciences
2006, named to the Order of British Columbia 
2008, awarded the Scopus Award of the Hebrew University of Jerusalem
2009, made a Member of the Order of Canada "for his contributions to prostate cancer research and treatment, as well as for promoting public awareness of the disease".
2016  awarded a lifetime achievement award from the Society Internationale d'Urologie
2016  awarded a lifetime achievement award from the Canadian Urological Association 
2017 awarded the prestigious HUgh Hampton Young award of the American Urology Association

References

External links
Profile at prostatecentre.com

Jewish Canadian scientists
Canadian medical researchers
Cancer researchers
University of Toronto alumni
Members of the Order of British Columbia
Members of the Order of Canada
Living people
1953 births
University of Washington faculty
Academic staff of the University of British Columbia
Physicians from British Columbia
Scientists from Toronto
Scientists from British Columbia
20th-century Canadian scientists
21st-century Canadian scientists
20th-century Canadian physicians
21st-century Canadian physicians